Deception is a 2003 film starring Debi Mazar, Karina Lombard,  Jack Langedijk and Marc Lavoine.

Plot
Unscrupulous Margaret, whose rich father bankrupted her family and committed suicide, uses her French gigolo boytoy Robert to swindle the fortune from her childhood friend Janet and her wealthy father Max.

References

External links

2003 films
2003 thriller films